= Wachanaruka, California =

Wachanaruka is a former Costanoan settlement in Monterey County, California, United States. It was located on Rancho Salinas; its precise location is unknown.
